Christians in Guinea-Bissau constitute approximately 10 percent (~153,300) of the country's population (1,533,964 - 2009 est.). Other sources report the population of Christians in Guinea-Bissau may vary from 5 to 13%. 

Guinea-Bissau is the only Portuguese-speaking nation with a Muslim plurality, wherein others are mostly Christian. Christians belong to a number of groups, including the Roman Catholic Church (including Portuguese Guinea-Bissauans) and various Protestant denominations. Christians are concentrated in Bissau and other large towns.

Foreign missionaries operate in the country without restriction.

The Constitution provides for freedom of religion, and the Government generally respected this right in practice. In 2007, the US government received no reports of societal abuses or discrimination based on religious belief or practice.

Roman Catholicism

Most Christians in Guinea-Bissau are Roman Catholic (about 125,000 Catholics in Guinea-Bissau, or just under 10% of the total population).

There are two dioceses:
Bafatá
Bissau

See also
Religion in Guinea-Bissau
Islam in Guinea-Bissau

References

External links
Diocese of Bissau